Warfield Richards Red Bow (June 26, 1948 – March 28, 1993) was a South Dakota Lakotan known for his music.

Life and career
Richards was adopted into the Red Bow family at a young age. He grew up on the Pine Ridge Indian Reservation near Red Shirt, South Dakota and went to school in Rapid City, South Dakota. He dropped out of high school to become an actor and later served in the Vietnam War as a U.S. Marine in the 1960s.

Red Bow made several records in the 1980s and 1990s as a singer and musician. As an actor, he had minor roles in several Westerns, and a character in the 1989 film Powwow Highway, "Buddy Red Bow", was based on his life.

Death
Red Bow died on March 28, 1993 in the Rapid City Regional Hospital in Rapid City of Cirrhosis of the Liver, and was buried in Christ Church Episcopal Cemetery (Red Shirt). He was posthumously inducted into the Native American Music Awards Hall of Fame in 1998.

Discography
 Hard Rider (soundtrack, 1972)
 BRB (1981) 
 Journey to the Spirit World (1983)
 Black Hills Dreamer (1995)

Filmography
 How the West Was Won (1962)
 Young Guns II (1990) (credited as Chief Buddy Redbow)
 Thunderheart (1992)

References
Notes

External links

Allmusic page

1948 births
1993 deaths
Lakota people
Native American singers
American country singer-songwriters
United States Marine Corps personnel of the Vietnam War
Native American United States military personnel
Deaths from cirrhosis
20th-century American singers
Singers from South Dakota